Neitsijärv is a lake of Estonia's southern district of Valga. Neitsijärv is close to the larger lake Pühajärve and part of the Pühajärve resort area, near the winter capital of Otepää. An area of great natural beauty, it is a popular holiday resort location.

See also
 List of lakes of Estonia

Otepää Parish
Lakes of Valga County